The Lago do Cuniã Extractive Reserve is an extractive reserve in the state of Rondônia, Brazil.

Location

The Lago do Cuniã Extractive Reserve is in the municipality of Porto Velho, Rondônia.
The reserve is on the left (west) bank of the Madeira River.
It adjoins the Cuniã Ecological Station to the east and north and the Rio Madeira Sustainable Yield Forest (Floresta de Rendimento Sustentado) to the north and west.

The reserve contains the floodplains of large and small rivers, surrounded by fluvial terraces.
The relief is one of soft, rounded hills.
The reserve drains into the Madeira River.

Environment

The vegetation is mainly savanna-rainforest contact and pioneer fluvial forest.
The reserve has rich fauna, with birds like great egret (Ardea alba), jabiru (Jabiru mycteria), maguari stork (Ciconia maguari) and Neotropic cormorant (Phalacrocorax brasilianus) and large animals such as black caiman (Melanosuchus niger) and porpoise.
As of 2001 the reserve was home to 50 families with about 400 people whose main economic activity was fishing for food and for sale.
Almost all preserve traditional artisan techniques, including the skill learned from the Indians of making canoes.

History

The Lago do Cuniã Extractive Reserve was created by federal decree 3.238 of 10 November 1999, which was reworded on 9 May 2000.
It is classed as IUCN protected area category VI (protected area with sustainable use of natural resources).
Its basic objectives are to protect the livelihoods and culture of the traditional population and ensure the sustainable use of the natural resources.
It is administered by the Chico Mendes Institute for Biodiversity Conservation (ICMBio).
On 22 February 2002 lower limits were placed on fishing related to minimum size and period of fishing.
The deliberative council was created on 20 June 2006.

An ordinance of 9 January 2012 provided for a consistent and integrated approach to preparing management plans for the conservation units in the BR-319 area of influence. These are the Abufari Biological Reserve, Cuniã Ecological Station, Nascentes do Lago Jari and Mapinguari national parks, Balata-Tufari, Humaitá and Iquiri national forests, and the Lago do Capanã-Grande, Rio Ituxi, Médio Purus and Lago do Cuniã extractive reserves.
The usage plan of the reserve was approved on 10 July 2013.

Notes

Sources

Extractive reserves of Brazil
1999 establishments in Brazil
Protected areas of Rondônia